Spongiocnizontidae is a family of crustaceans belonging to the order Siphonostomatoida.

Genera:
 Apodomyzon Stock, 1970
 Spongiocnizon Stock & Kleeton, 1964

References

Siphonostomatoida